The men's 300 metre military rifle from three positions (originally called individual competition with army rifle) was a shooting sports event held as part of the Shooting at the 1912 Summer Olympics programme. It was the second appearance of the event, which had been introduced in 1908. The competition was held on Monday, 1 July 1912.

Ninety-one sport shooters from twelve nations competed.

Results

References

External links
 
 

Shooting at the 1912 Summer Olympics